Philip A. Palmesano (born April 25, 1969) is an American politician and member of the New York State Assembly. He represents the 132nd Assembly District which includes parts of Steuben, Seneca and Chemung counties and all of Schuyler and Yates counties.

Palmesano was born in the city of Hornell, New York, and graduated from Hornell High School in 1987. He earned a bachelor's degree in political science from St. Bonaventure University in 1991. After college he worked as an aide to several federal and state lawmakers including former State Assembly members Donald Davidsen and Jim Bacalles, who both represented parts of the district that Palmesano now represents. He worked as the district director for former Congressman Randy Kuhl in 2004 before joining the staff of former State Senator George Winner.

In 2009, Palmesano was elected to represent the city of Corning in the Steuben County Legislature. He served on the Agriculture, Industry and Planning Committee, and the Human Services, Health and Education Committees. In 2010, he was elected to the State Assembly as a Republican, defeating Independent democrat Jason Jordon.

Palmesano and his wife Laura reside in Corning with their two children, Leah and Sam.

Committees

Energy Committee
Libraries and Education Technology
Corporations, Authorities and Commissions
Real Property Taxation
Oversight, Analysis and Investigations Committee
New York State Legislative Commission on Rural Resources

References

External links
New York State Assembly member website

1969 births
Living people
American people of Italian descent
County legislators in New York (state)
Republican Party members of the New York State Assembly
St. Bonaventure University alumni
People from Hornell, New York
Politicians from Corning, New York
United States congressional aides
21st-century American politicians